Leviea is a genus of Melanesian jumping spiders. It was first described by Wayne Maddison and T. Szűts in 2019, and  it contains only three species: L. francesae, L. herberti, and L. lornae. The genus name and species epithets honor arachnologists Herbert Walter Levi and his wife Lorna Rose Levi as well as their daughter Frances Levi.

It was erected in 2019 for three newly described species from Papua New Guinea, and was placed in the tribe Myrmarachnini within the Salticoida clade of Salticinae. However, they aren't as ant-like as most other species in the tribe.

See also
 List of Salticidae genera

References

Salticidae genera
Arthropods of New Guinea